Tussy is an unincorporated community in Carter and Garvin counties, Oklahoma, United States. The post office was established March 1, 1890. The town of Tussy was named for Henry B. Tussy, rancher and cattleman.

References

Unincorporated communities in Carter County, Oklahoma
Unincorporated communities in Garvin County, Oklahoma
Unincorporated communities in Oklahoma